Torno a vivere da solo (I'll be back to living alone) is a 2008 Italian comedy film written, directed and starred by Jerry Calà. It is the sequel of Marco Risi's Vado a vivere da solo (1982).

Plot 
In Milan, Giacomo is a good real estate agent. But he fights with his wife, because he does not stand his life, and wants to be the guy globetrotter of yesteryear. The two are separated, and Giacomo tries to change his life with Jessica. However, Giacomo has to deal with the problems of the life of a grown man, because he can no longer act like a kid.

Cast 
 Jerry Calà: Giacomo
 Enzo Iacchetti: Ivano
 Tosca D'Aquino: Francesca
 Paolo Villaggio: Giacomo's father
 Éva Henger: Jessica
 Don Johnson (dubbed by Roberto Pedicini): Nico
 Randi Ingerman: Lory
 Gisella Sofio: Giacomo's mother
 Mercédesz Henger: Chiara 
 Mara Venier: Herself 
 Piero Mazzarella: Barbone
 Sergio Fiorentini: Peppino

References

External links

2008 films
Italian comedy films
2008 comedy films
Films directed by Jerry Calà